Philipp Friedrich Silcher (27 June 1789 in Schnait (today part of Weinstadt) – 26 August 1860 in Tübingen), was a German composer, mainly known for his lieder (songs), and an important Volkslied collector.

Life 
Silcher was meant to be a school teacher, but dedicated himself entirely to music in the seminary in Ludwigsburg after he met Carl Maria von Weber. He was taught composition and piano by Conradin Kreutzer and Johann Nepomuk Hummel. In 1817 he was named musical director at the University of Tübingen. He is regarded as one of the most important protagonists of choir singing. He arranged many German Volkslieder and international folk songs that have remained standard repertoire of many choirs in Germany and became an integral part of German daily life. In 1829 Silcher founded the "Akademische Liedertafel" in Tübingen and directed it until his death.

He was married to Luise Rosine Ensslin (1804–1871). They had two daughters and one son.

The asteroid 10055 Silcher also bears the composer's name.

Works
Amongst his best-known songs are:

"Ich hatt' einen Kameraden"
"Alle Jahre wieder"
"" (also set by Schubert, but popular in Silcher's version)
"Die Lorelei"
Abschied ("Muss i' denn zum Städtele hinaus"), which "inspired" the English-language "Wooden Heart" made famous by Elvis Presley when he was stationed in Germany during his military service.
 Melody of "So nimm denn meine Hände", originally for a different song
 Ännchen von Tharau

References

External links

 
 
 
 Silcher Museum in Weinstadt 
 
 
 "The song of the Lorelei" (English lyrics and MP3)
  
 Silcher Monument in Tübingen, atlasobscura.com 

1789 births
1860 deaths
People from Rems-Murr-Kreis
German Romantic composers
Academic staff of the University of Tübingen
19th-century classical composers
German male classical composers
19th-century German composers
19th-century German male musicians